Bùi Đình Dĩnh is a Vietnamese diplomat and is the current Ambassador Extraordinary and Plenipotentiary of the Socialist Republic of Vietnam to the Russian Federation from 2007 to 2011.

References 

Year of birth missing (living people)
Living people
Ambassadors of Vietnam to Russia